Dương Đông is the main town on Vietnam's largest island Phú Quốc, off the coast of south-west Cambodia. The population in 2020 was 60,415. Võ Thị Sáu Street runs from the town to the beach.

See also
 Phu Quoc International Airport, 10 km away
 Duong Dong Airport, closed December 2012
 Phú Quốc National Park

References

Populated places in Kiên Giang province
District capitals in Vietnam
Townships in Vietnam